El Cuarto de Cuca is the fourth album by Cuca, a Mexican hard rock group originally from Guadalajara, Jalisco.

In this production Jose Fors returned to the ranks of Cuca together to close the life cycle of the group, which is separated after a series of farewell concerts across Mexico.

Track listing

Personnel 

 Jose Fors – Vocals, Design
 Carlos Avilez – Bass
 Galo Ocha – Guitar
 Ignacio Gonzalez - Drums
 Francisco Aceves – Illustrations
 Cuca – Producer
 Carlos Goméz – Photography
 Oscar Lopez – Producer
 Ricardo Mollo – Producer
 Dave O'Donnell – Mixing
 Ruben Parra – Executive Producer
 John Thomas – Engineer
 Leon Zervos – Mastering

Singles and videos  
 Tu Flor

1997 albums
Cuca (band) albums